Jorge Matias (14 March 1957 – 27 June 2001) was a Portuguese equestrian. He competed in the individual jumping event at the 1992 Summer Olympics.

References

1957 births
2001 deaths
Portuguese male equestrians
Olympic equestrians of Portugal
Equestrians at the 1992 Summer Olympics
Sportspeople from Lisbon